Monica Ceccon (born 2 March 1976 ) is a road cyclist representing Italy and Saint Kitts and Nevis. She represented Saint Kitts and Nevis in 2009 and competed at the 2009 UCI Road World Championships.

References

External links
 

1976 births
Italian female cyclists
Saint Kitts and Nevis female cyclists
Living people
Place of birth missing (living people)